The following is the 1961–62 network television schedule for the three major English language commercial broadcast networks in the United States. The schedule covers primetime hours from September 1961 through April 1962. The schedule is followed by a list per network of returning series, new series, and series cancelled after the 1960–61 season.

The previous season had been excoriated by Federal Communications Commission chairman Newton Minow in May 1961. Minow had criticized poor programs and weak network schedules, calling television a "vast wasteland" and calling on television executives to try harder to develop innovative and interesting television programs.

Television historians Castleman and Podrazik (1982) believe the 1961–62 season marked a comeback for television, as the networks rearranged their schedules to accommodate the critics. They point out CBS's high-quality legal drama The Defenders, NBC's medical drama Dr. Kildare, CBS's The Dick Van Dyke Show, and ABC's medical drama Ben Casey as bright spots in the new TV schedule. Despite the praise for these four series, the authors also highlight several less worthy series which debuted during the 1961–62 season: Room for One More, Window on Main Street, Hazel ("possibly the dumbest family in TV history"), and the truly terrible The Hathaways ("possibly the worst series ever to air on network TV").

NBC lured Disney's popular anthology series from ABC; Walt Disney's Wonderful World of Color premiered on September 24, 1961. The color programs were a change from the previous ABC programs, which had been seen in black and white.

NBC also added a movie night to its schedule; the network paid $25 million for the rights to broadcast 50 20th-Century Fox films on Saturday nights. In April 1962, ABC followed suit when it added its own Sunday night movie to its schedule.

All times are Eastern and Pacific. New fall series are highlighted in bold.

Each of the 30 highest-rated shows is listed with its rank and rating as determined by Nielsen Media Research.

 Yellow indicates the programs in the top 10 for the season.
 Cyan indicates the programs in the top 20 for the season.
 Magenta indicates the programs in the top 30 for the season.

Sunday 

* formerly Walt Disney Presents

Note: Mister Ed, previously syndicated, aired on CBS, 6:30-7 p.m.

Monday 

* In some areas, Douglas Edwards with the News alongside Walter Cronkite with the News and The Huntley-Brinkley Report aired at 6:45 p.m.(ET).

Tuesday

Wednesday 

Note: Mrs. G. Goes to College moved to Thursday nights in January as The Gertrude Berg Show, allowing The Dick Van Dyke Show to take its time spot. Several episodes of The Joey Bishop Show and Wagon Train were shown in color.

Thursday

Notes: The Bob Cummings Show was retitled The New Bob Cummings Show on December 28. The Law and Mr. Jones moved to the 9:30-10:00 p.m. time slot on ABC on April 19. Hazel on November 2, 1961 was shown in color. The episodes of Brenner that ran on CBS in the summer of 1962 were reruns of episodes from the summer of 1959.

Friday 

* formerly Eyewitness To History
** formerly The Chevy Show

Saturday 

Room for One More aired on ABC from January 27 to July 28, 1962, 8-8:30 p.m.

Beginning January 6, Matty's Funday Funnies became Matty's Funnies With Beany & Cecil.

By network

ABC

Returning Series
77 Sunset Strip
Adventures in Paradise
The Adventures of Ozzie and Harriet
The Avengers
Bachelor Father
Bronco
The Bugs Bunny Show
Cheyenne
The Donna Reed Show
Expedition!
The Fight of the Week
The Flintstones
Hawaiian Eye
The Law and Mr. Jones
Lawman
The Lawrence Welk Show
Leave It to Beaver
Make That Spare
Matty's Funday Funnies
Maverick
My Three Sons
Naked City
The Real McCoys
The Rifleman
The Roaring 20's
The Steve Allen Show
Surfside 6
The Untouchables

New Series
Alcoa Premiere
Ben Casey
Bus Stop
Calvin and the Colonel
The Hathaways
Howard K. Smith: News and Comment *
Margie
The New Breed
Room for One More *
Straightaway
Target: The Corruptors!
Top Cat
Yours for a Song

Not returning from 1960–61:
Alcoa Presents: One Step Beyond
The Asphalt Jungle
Guestward, Ho!
Harrigan and Son
Hong Kong
The Islanders
The Life and Legend of Wyatt Earp
Peter Gunn
The Rebel
Stagecoach West
Sugarfoot
Take a Good Look
Walt Disney Presents (moved to NBC as Walt Disney's Wonderful World of Color)

CBS

Returning Series
The Alfred Hitchcock Hour
The Andy Griffith Show
Armstrong Circle Theatre
Brenner
Candid Camera
CBS News Hour
CBS Reports
Checkmate
The Danny Thomas Show
Dennis the Menace
Douglas Edwards with the News
The Ed Sullivan Show
Eyewitness
The Garry Moore Show
General Electric Theatre
Gunsmoke
Have Gun – Will Travel
Hennesey
I've Got a Secret
The Jack Benny Program
Lassie
The Many Loves of Dobie Gillis
Perry Mason
Pete and Gladys
Rawhide
The Red Skelton Show
Route 66
Secret Agent
To Tell the Truth
The Twentieth Century
The Twilight Zone
The United States Steel Hour
What's My Line

New Series
Accent on an American Summer
The Alvin Show
The Defenders
The Dick Van Dyke Show
Eyewitness to History
Father of the Bride
Frontier Circus
Ichabod and Me
The Investigators
Mister Ed *
Mrs. G. Goes to College/The Gertrude Berg Show
The New Bob Cummings Show
Oh! Those Bells *
Password *
Tell It to Groucho *
Tell It to the Camera *
Walter Cronkite with the News *
Window on Main Street

Not returning from 1960–61:
Angel
The Ann Sothern Show
The Aquanauts
Bringing Up Buddy
Dick Powell's Zane Grey Theater
The DuPont Show with June Allyson
Frontier Justice
Glenn Miller Time
Gunslinger
Have Gun — Will Travel
Holiday Lodge
Mr. Garlund
My Sister Eileen
Person to Person
The Spike Jones Show
Summer Sports Spectacular
The Tom Ewell Show
Wanted: Dead or Alive
'Way Out
The Witness

NBC

Returning Series
The Art Linkletter Show
The Bell Telephone Hour
Bonanza
Chet Huntley Reporting
The Detectives Starring Robert Taylor
The Dinah Shore Show
Ford Presents the New Christy Minstrels
The Huntley–Brinkley Report
The Jack Benny Program
Kraft Music Hall starring Perry Como
Laramie
National Velvet
Outlaws
Sing Along with Mitch
Thriller
Wagon Train
Walt Disney's Wonderful World of Color (moved from ABC)

New Series
87th Precinct
The Bob Newhart Show
The Bullwinkle Show
Cain's Hundred
Car 54, Where Are You?
David Brinkley's Journal
The Dick Powell Show
Dr. Kildare
The DuPont Show of the Week
Hazel
Here and Now
International Showtime *
NBC Saturday Night at the Movies
Theatre '62

Not returning from 1960–61:
Acapulco
The Americans
The Art Carney Special
The Barbara Stanwyck Show
Bat Masterson
The Campaign and the Candidates
The Chevy Mystery Show
Concentration
Dan Raven
Dante
The Deputy
The Dinah Shore Chevy Show
Five Star Jubilee
The Ford Show
Great Ghost Tales
The Groucho Show
Happy
It Could Be You
Jackpot Bowling starring Milton Berle
Klondike
The Man from Interpol
Michael Shayne
The Nation's Future
Omnibus
One Happy Family
Peter Loves Mary
Riverboat
Shirley Temple's Storybook
The Tab Hunter Show
Tales of Wells Fargo
The Tall Man
This Is Your Life
The Westerner
Westinghouse Playhouse Starring Nanette Fabray and Wendell Corey
Westinghouse Preview Theatre

Note: The * indicates that the program was introduced in midseason.

References

 Castleman, H. & Podrazik, W. (1982). Watching TV: Four Decades of American Television. New York: McGraw-Hill. 314 pp.
 McNeil, Alex. Total Television. Fourth edition. New York: Penguin Books. .
 Brooks, Tim & Marsh, Earle (1984). The Complete Directory to Prime Time Network TV Shows (3rd ed.). New York: Ballantine. .

United States primetime network television schedules
1961 in American television
1962 in American television